Guttahalli may refer to several places in or near Bangalore, Karnataka, India:

 Palace Guttahalli, a neighborhood in Bangalore
 Rajmahal Guttahalli, a neighborhood in Bangalore
 Gavipuram Guttahalli, a neighborhood in Bangalore
 Guttahalli, Kolar West, a village in Kolar Taluk, Kolar district
 Guttahalli, Kolar South, a village in Kolar Taluk, Kolar district
 Guttahalli, Bangarapet North, a village in Bangarapet Taluk, Kolar district
 Guttahalli, Bangarapet South, a village in Bangarapet Taluk, Kolar district
 Guttahalli, KGF, a village in KGF Taluk, Kolar district
 Hulkuru, locally known as Guttahalli and Bangaru Tirupati, a village in KGF Taluk, Kolar district
 Guttahalli, Chintamani (village code 624567), a village in Chintamani Taluk, Chikkaballapura district
 Guttahalli, Chintamani (village code 624588), a village in Chintamani Taluk, Chikkaballapura district
 Chikkaguttahalli, a village in Mulbagal Taluk, Kolar district
 Chikkanallaguttahalli, a village in Bangarapet Taluk, Kolar district
 Deshapande Guttahalli, a village in Anekal Taluk, Bangalore Urban district
 Devaguttahalli, a village in Sidlaghatta Taluk, Chikkaballapura district
 Doddaguttahalli, a village in Mulbagal Taluk, Kolar district
 Guguttahalli, a village in Hosakote Taluk, Bangalore Rural district
 Hirenahalli Guttahalli, a village in Bangarapet Taluk, Kolar district
 K. Raguttahalli, a village in Chintamani Taluk, Chikkaballapura district
 Kamaguttahalli, a village in Chintamani Taluk, Chikkaballapura district
 Kammaguttahalli, a village in Chikkaballapura Taluk, Chikkaballapura district
 Korathaguttahalli, a village in Sidlaghatta Taluk, Chikkaballapura district
 Madivala-Majara Guttahalli, a village in KGF Taluk, Kolar district
 Nallaguttahalli Bangarapet, a village in Bangarapet Taluk, Kolar district
 Nallaguttahalli, Chikkaballapura, a village in Chikkaballapura Taluk, Chikkaballapura district
 Nallaguttahalli, Sidlaghatta, a village in Sidlaghatta Taluk, Chikkaballapura district
 Nallaguttahalli, Chintamani, a village in Chintamani Taluk, Chikkaballapura district
 Nallaguttahalli, Chintamani, a village in Chintamani Taluk, Chikkaballapura district
 Nallaguttahalli, Chintamani, a village in Chintamani Taluk, Chikkaballapura district
 Pillaguttahalli, a village in Gauribidanur Taluk, Chikkaballapura district
 Sarakariguttahalli, a village in Hosakote Taluk, Bangalore Rural district
 V. Guttahalli, a village in Mulbagal Taluk, Kolar district
 Vaddaguttahalli, a village in Mulbagal Taluk, Kolar district

References

India geography-related lists